Evergreen Historic District may refer to:
 New Evergreen Commercial Historic District, Evergreen, AL, listed on the NRHP in Alabama
 Evergreen Historic District (Mesa, Arizona), listed on the NRHP in Maricopa County, Arizona
 Evergreen Conference District, Evergreen, CO, listed on the NRHP in Colorado
 Vollintine Evergreen Avalon Historic District, Memphis, TN, listed on the NRHP in Tennessee
 Evergreen Historic District (Memphis, Tennessee), aka Evergreen, Memphis, listed on the NRHP in Tennessee
 Vollintine Evergreen Historic District, Memphis, TN, listed on the NRHP in Tennessee
 Vollintine Evergreen North Historic District, Memphis, TN, listed on the NRHP in Tennessee
 Evergreen Avenue Historic District, East Mill Creek, UT, listed on the NRHP in Utah